Mahmoud Wadi (born 19 December 1994) is a Palestinian association footballer who plays as a striker for Egyptian Premier League club Tala'ea El Gaish, on loan from Pyramids, and the Palestine national team. Wadi is nicknamed "the Tower" because of his tall stature and regular goals scored by his head.

Club career

Al-Ahli
In August 2017, After impressing with Ahli Al-Khaleel in the 2016 AFC Cup Wadi moved to Amman via Egypt through the Rafah Border Crossing, to play football for Al-Ahli in the capital of Jordan. A year earlier Wadi was restricted from leaving Gaza to return to his club in the West Bank by Israeli authorities. During the 2017–18 Jordanian premier league season, Wadi scored 10 goals in 17 league games for the club.

Al-Masry
In June 2018, Wadi signed a two-year contract with 2017–18 Egyptian Premier League 3rd placed side Al-Masry, based in Port Said, after only one season in Jordan.

On 3 August 2018, Wadi made his debut for Al-Masry, coming off the bench to complete four minutes against El Gouna in a 1–0 victory.

Pyramids
On 11 November 2020, Pyramids announced the signing of Wadi on a four-year contract.

International career

Palestine senior team

Wadi made his debut for the national team on 14 November 2017 against Maldives in the 2019 AFC Asian Cup qualification in Jenin, West Bank. Coming off the bench in the 50th minute, and winning the game 8–1.

References

External links
 

1994 births
Living people
Palestinian footballers
Palestine international footballers
Palestinian expatriates in Jordan
Palestinian expatriate sportspeople in Egypt
Association football forwards
People from Khan Yunis Governorate
2019 AFC Asian Cup players
Pyramids FC players
Al Masry SC players
Tala'ea El Gaish SC players